Daymon Ely is an American politician and attorney, currently serving as a member of the New Mexico House of Representatives from the 23rd district, which includes portions of Sandoval County and Bernalillo County.

Early life and education 
Ely was born on October 11, 1957 in Philadelphia and raised in Phoenix, Arizona. He earned a Bachelor of Arts in History and Juris Doctor from the Arizona State University.

Career 
After graduating from law school, Ely became a legal malpractice attorney. From 2000 to 2004, Ely served on the Sandoval County Commission, and as its chair in 2004. Ely was elected to the New Mexico House of Representatives in 2017. Ely is a member of the Democratic Party.

In the House, Ely has supported Red flag laws.

References 

Living people
1957 births
Democratic Party members of the New Mexico House of Representatives
Politicians from Philadelphia
New Mexico lawyers
Arizona State University alumni
21st-century American politicians